Khimprom may refer to:
 Khim Prom, chemical factory located in Kharkiv Oblast, Ukraine
 Khimprom (Volgograd) in Volgograd, Russia
 Cheboksary Khimprom in Novocheboksarsk, Russia